The Wilhelm Order ("Wilhelmsorden") of Hesse-Kassel (or Hesse-Cassel) was instituted by the Elector Friedrich Wilhelm I on 20 August 1851 as a civil and military Order of Merit. It was composed of the three lower grades of the Order of the Golden Lion and a Grand Cross was added.
In total the order was awarded more than 450 times in the 16 years of its existence. 

The motto of the Order was Virtuti et Fidelitate, and the ribbon was Carmine-red with red and white borders.

On 1 August 1866, Hesse-Kassel was annexed by Prussia and on 3 October of that same year the Hesse-Kassellian orders were incorporated into the Prussian system of honours. On 27 August 1875 the Order was abolished. Although there were no new awards by the Prussian Kings in the 1866–1875 era, the exiled Elector Friedrich Wilhelm I. awarded the order approximately 8 times until his death in 1875.

The Order is not to be confused with the exclusive
Military Order of William of the Netherlands
or
The Wilhelm-Orden of Prussia.

References

Maximilian Gritzner, Handbuch der Ritter-und Verdienstorden (Leipzig, 1893)
 Werner Sauer, Die Orden und Ehrenzeichen des Kurfürstentums Hessen-Kassel (Hamburg, n.d.)

Orders of chivalry of Germany
Orders, decorations, and medals of Hesse
1851 establishments in Germany
1850s in the Electorate of Hesse
Establishments in the Electorate of Hesse
Awards established in 1851